Sir John Frederick William Herschel, 1st Baronet  (7 March 1792 – 11 May 1871) was an English polymath active as a mathematician, astronomer, chemist, inventor, experimental photographer who invented the blueprint and did botanical work.

Herschel originated the use of the Julian day system in astronomy. He named seven moons of Saturn and four moons of Uranus – the seventh planet, discovered by his father Sir William Herschel. He made many contributions to the science of photography, and investigated colour blindness and the chemical power of ultraviolet rays. His Preliminary Discourse (1831), which advocated an inductive approach to scientific experiment and theory-building, was an important contribution to the philosophy of science.

Early life and work on astronomy 

 
Herschel was born in Slough, Buckinghamshire, the son of Mary Baldwin and astronomer  William Herschel. He was the nephew of astronomer Caroline Herschel. He studied shortly at Eton College and St John's College, Cambridge, graduating as Senior Wrangler in 1813. It was during his time as an undergraduate that he became friends with the mathematicians Charles Babbage and George Peacock. He left Cambridge in 1816 and started working with his father. He took up astronomy in 1816, building a reflecting telescope with a mirror  in diameter, and with a  focal length. Between 1821 and 1823 he re-examined, with James South, the double stars catalogued by his father. He was one of the founders of the Royal Astronomical Society in 1820. For his work with his father, he was presented with the Gold Medal of the Royal Astronomical Society in 1826 (which he won again in 1836), and with the Lalande Medal of the French Academy of Sciences in 1825, while in 1821 the Royal Society bestowed upon him the Copley Medal for his mathematical contributions to their Transactions. Herschel was made a Knight of the Royal Guelphic Order in 1831. He also seemed to be aware of Indian thought and mathematics introduced to him by George Everest as claimed by Mary Boole:

He stated in his historical article Mathematics in Brewster's Cyclopedia:

Herschel served as president of the Royal Astronomical Society three times: 1827–1829, 1839–1841 and 1847–1849.

Herschel's A preliminary discourse on the study of natural philosophy, published early in 1831 as part of Dionysius Lardner's Cabinet cyclopædia, set out methods of scientific investigation with an orderly relationship between observation and theorising. He described nature as being governed by laws which were difficult to discern or to state mathematically, and the highest aim of natural philosophy was understanding these laws through inductive reasoning, finding a single unifying explanation for a phenomenon. This became an authoritative statement with wide influence on science, particularly at the University of Cambridge where it inspired the student Charles Darwin with "a burning zeal" to contribute to this work.

He was elected as a member to the American Philosophical Society in 1854.

Herschel published a catalogue of his astronomical observations in 1864, as the General Catalogue of Nebulae and Clusters, a compilation of his own work and that of his father's, expanding on the senior Herschel's Catalogue of Nebulae. A further complementary volume was published posthumously, as the General Catalogue of 10,300 Multiple and Double Stars.

Herschel correctly considered astigmatism to be due to irregularity of the cornea and theorised that vision could be improved by the application of some animal jelly contained in a capsule of glass against the cornea. His views were published in an article entitled Light in 1828 and the Encyclopædia Metropolitana in 1845.

Discoveries of Herschel include the galaxies NGC 7, NGC 10, NGC 25, and NGC 28.

Visit to South Africa 

He declined an offer from the Duke of Sussex that they travel to South Africa on a Navy ship. Herschel had his own inherited money and he paid £500 for passage on the S.S. Mountstuart Elphinstone. He, his wife, their three children and his 20 inch telescope departed from Portsmouth on 13 November 1833.

The voyage to South Africa was made to catalogue the stars, nebulae, and other objects of the southern skies. This was to be a completion as well as extension of the survey of the northern heavens undertaken initially by his father William Herschel. He arrived in Cape Town on 15 January 1834 and set up a private  telescope at Feldhausen at Claremont, a suburb of Cape Town. Amongst his other observations during this time was that of the return of Comet Halley. Herschel collaborated with Thomas Maclear, the Astronomer Royal at the Cape of Good Hope and the members of the two families became close friends. During this time, he also witnessed the Great Eruption of Eta Carinae (December 1837).

In addition to his astronomical work, however, this voyage to a far corner of the British empire also gave Herschel an escape from the pressures under which he found himself in London, where he was one of the most sought-after of all British men of science. While in southern Africa, he engaged in a broad variety of scientific pursuits free from a sense of strong obligations to a larger scientific community. It was, he later recalled, probably the happiest time in his life.

Herschel combined his talents with those of his wife, Margaret, and between 1834 and 1838 they produced 131 botanical illustrations of fine quality, showing the Cape flora. Herschel used a camera lucida to obtain accurate outlines of the specimens and left the details to his wife. Even though their portfolio had been intended as a personal record, and despite the lack of floral dissections in the paintings, their accurate rendition makes them more valuable than many contemporary collections. Some 112 of the 132 known flower studies were collected and published as Flora Herscheliana in 1996. The book also included work by Charles Davidson Bell and Thomas Bowler.

As their home during their stay in the Cape, the Herschels had selected 'Feldhausen' ("Field Houses"), an old estate on the south-eastern side of Table Mountain. Here John set up his reflector to begin his survey of the southern skies.

Herschel, at the same time, read widely. Intrigued by the ideas of gradual formation of landscapes set out in Charles Lyell's Principles of Geology, he wrote to Lyell on 20 February 1836 praising the book as a work that would bring "a complete revolution in [its] subject, by altering entirely the point of view in which it must thenceforward be contemplated" and opening a way for bold speculation on "that mystery of mysteries, the replacement of extinct species by others." Herschel himself thought catastrophic extinction and renewal "an inadequate conception of the Creator" and by analogy with other intermediate causes, "the origination of fresh species, could it ever come under our cognizance, would be found to be a natural in contradistinction to a miraculous process". He prefaced his words with the couplet:

Taking a gradualist view of development and referring to evolutionary descent from a proto-language, Herschel commented:

The document was circulated, and Charles Babbage incorporated extracts in his ninth and unofficial Bridgewater Treatise, which postulated laws set up by a divine programmer. When HMS Beagle called at Cape Town, Captain Robert FitzRoy and the young naturalist Charles Darwin visited Herschel on 3 June 1836. Later on, Darwin would be influenced by Herschel's writings in developing his theory advanced in The Origin of Species. In the opening lines of that work, Darwin writes that his intent is "to throw some light on the origin of species – that mystery of mysteries, as it has been called by one of our greatest philosophers," referring to Herschel.  However, Herschel ultimately rejected the theory of natural selection.

Herschel returned to England in 1838, was created a baronet, of Slough in the County of Buckingham, and published Results of Astronomical Observations made at the Cape of Good Hope in 1847. In this publication he proposed the names still used today for the seven then-known satellites of Saturn: Mimas, Enceladus, Tethys, Dione, Rhea, Titan, and Iapetus. In the same year, Herschel received his second Copley Medal from the Royal Society for this work.  A few years later, in 1852, he proposed the names still used today for the four then-known satellites of Uranus: Ariel, Umbriel, Titania, and Oberon. A stone obelisk, erected in 1842 and now in the grounds of The Grove Primary School, marks the site where his 20-ft reflector once stood.

Photography 

Herschel made numerous important contributions to photography. He made improvements in photographic processes, particularly in inventing the cyanotype process, which became known as blueprints, and variations, such as the chrysotype. In 1839, he made a photograph on glass, which still exists, and experimented with some colour reproduction, noting that rays of different parts of the spectrum tended to impart their own colour to a photographic paper. Herschel made experiments using photosensitive emulsions of vegetable juices, called phytotypes, also known as anthotypes, and published his discoveries in the Philosophical Transactions of the Royal Society of London in 1842.  He collaborated in the early 1840s with Henry Collen, portrait painter to Queen Victoria.  Herschel originally discovered the platinum process on the basis of the light sensitivity of platinum salts, later developed by William Willis.

Herschel coined the term photography in 1839. Herschel was also the first to apply the terms negative and positive to photography.

Herschel discovered sodium thiosulfate to be a solvent of silver halides in 1819, and informed Talbot and Daguerre of his discovery that this "hyposulphite of soda" ("hypo") could be used as a photographic fixer, to "fix" pictures and make them permanent, after experimentally applying it thus in early 1839.

Herschel's ground-breaking research on the subject was read at the Royal Society in London in March 1839 and January 1840.

Other aspects of Herschel's career 

Herschel wrote many papers and articles, including entries on meteorology, physical geography and the telescope for the eighth edition of the Encyclopædia Britannica. He also translated the Iliad of Homer.

In 1823, Herschel published his findings on the optical spectra of metal salts.

Herschel invented the actinometer in 1825 to measure the direct heating power of the Sun's rays, and his work with the instrument is of great importance in the early history of photochemistry.

Herschel proposed a correction to the Gregorian calendar, making years that are multiples of 4000 common years rather than leap years, thus reducing the average length of the calendar year from 365.2425 days to 365.24225. Although this is closer to the mean tropical year of 365.24219 days, his proposal has never been adopted because the Gregorian calendar is based on the mean time between vernal equinoxes (currently  days).

Herschel was elected a Foreign Honorary Member of the American Academy of Arts and Sciences in 1832, and in 1836, a foreign member of the Royal Swedish Academy of Sciences.

In 1835, the New York Sun newspaper wrote a series of satiric articles that came to be known as the Great Moon Hoax, with statements falsely attributed to Herschel about his supposed discoveries of animals living on the Moon, including batlike winged humanoids.

Several locations are named for him: the village of Herschel in western Saskatchewan, Canada, site of the discovery of  Dolichorhynchops herschelensis, a type of plesiosaur; Mount Herschel in Antarctica; the crater J. Herschel on the Moon; and the settlement of Herschel, Eastern Cape and the Herschel Girls' School in Cape Town, South Africa.

While it is commonly accepted that Herschel Island, in the Arctic Ocean, part of the Yukon Territory, was named after him, the entries in the expedition journal of Sir John Franklin state that the latter wished to honour the Herschel family, of which John Herschel's father, Sir William Herschel, and his aunt, Caroline Herschel, are as notable as John.

Family 

Herschel married his cousin Margaret Brodie Stewart (1810–1884) on 3 March 1829 in Edinburgh, and was father of the following children:

 Caroline Emilia Mary Herschel (31 March 1830 – 29 January 1909), who married the soldier and politician Alexander Hamilton-Gordon
 Isabella Herschel (5 June 1831 – 1893)
 Sir William James Herschel, 2nd Bt. (9 January 1833 – 1917),
 Margaret Louisa Herschel (1834–1861), an accomplished artist
 Prof. Alexander Stewart Herschel (1836–1907), FRS, FRAS
 Col. John Herschel FRS, FRAS, (1837–1921) surveyor
 Maria Sophia Herschel (1839–1929)
 Amelia Herschel (1841–1926) married Sir Thomas Francis Wade, diplomat and sinologist
 Julia Herschel (1842–1933) married on 4 June 1878 to Captain (later Admiral) John Fiot Lee Pearse Maclear
 Matilda Rose Herschel (1844–1914), a gifted artist, married William Waterfield (Indian Civil Service)
 Francisca Herschel (1846–1932)
 Constance Anne Herschel (1855–20 June 1939), mathematician and scientist who became lecturer in natural sciences at Girton College, Cambridge

Death 

Herschel died on 11 May 1871 at age 79 at Collingwood, his home near Hawkhurst in Kent.  On his death, he was given a national funeral and buried in Westminster Abbey.

His obituary by Henry W Field of London was read to the American Philosophical Society on 1 December 1871.

Bibliography 

 
 On the Aberration of Compound Lenses and Object-Glasses (1821)
 Book-length articles on "Light", "Sound" and "Physical Astronomy" for the Encyclopaedia Metropolitana (30 vols. 1817–45)

 
 
 
 
 Manual of Scientific Inquiry (ed.), (1849)
 Meteorology (1861)
 
 
 General Catalogue of 10,300 Multiple and Double Stars (published posthumously)
 
 General Catalogue of Nebulae and Clusters

Arms

References

Works cited

Further reading 
 On Herschel's relationship with Charles Babbage, William Whewell, and Richard Jones, see

External links 

 

 Biographical information 
 R. Derek Wood (2008), 'Fourteenth March 1839, Herschel's Key to Photography'
 Herschel Museum of Astronomy
 Science in the Making Herschel's papers in the Royal Society's archives
 Wikisource copy of a notice from 1823 concerning the star catalogue, published in Astronomische Nachrichten

1792 births
1871 deaths
19th-century British astronomers
Photographers from Buckinghamshire
19th-century English photographers
Alumni of St John's College, Cambridge
Baronets in the Baronetage of the United Kingdom
Burials at Westminster Abbey
English Christians
English people of German descent
Fellows of the American Academy of Arts and Sciences
Fellows of the Royal Astronomical Society
Fellows of the Royal Society
Honorary members of the Saint Petersburg Academy of Sciences
Masters of the Mint
Members of the Royal Swedish Academy of Sciences
People educated at Eton College
People from Slough
Pioneers of photography
Presidents of the Royal Astronomical Society
Proto-evolutionary biologists
Recipients of the Copley Medal
Recipients of the Gold Medal of the Royal Astronomical Society
Recipients of the Pour le Mérite (civil class)
Rectors of the University of Aberdeen
Royal Medal winners
Senior Wranglers
Spectroscopists
John
Recipients of the Lalande Prize
Translators of Homer
Wynberg, Cape Town